Vašca (in older sources also Vašce) is a settlement in the Municipality of Cerklje na Gorenjskem in the Upper Carniola region of Slovenia.

References

External links

Vašca on Geopedia

Populated places in the Municipality of Cerklje na Gorenjskem